Pavliuk, Pavlyuk, Pavluk (German transliteration Pawluk, Pawliuk, Pawlyuk common among emigrants from the Austria-Hungary) is  Ukrainian-language patronymic surname derived from the given name, Pavlo (Paul).

It may refer to :
Ihor Pavlyuk (born 1967), Ukrainian writer and translator
Yevhen Pavlyuk (born 2002), Ukrainian football player
Pavlo Pavliuk (died 1638), leader of a 1637 Cossack rebellion
David Pavluk of The Downtown Fiction band
Mykola Pawluk (born 1956), British TV editor
Oleksandr Pavlyuk (born 1970), Ukrainian military officer and government official

See also
 

Ukrainian-language surnames
Surnames of Ukrainian origin
Patronymic surnames